The PZL P.1 was a Polish fighter, designed by the engineer Zygmunt Puławski, manufactured by the PZL state-owned factory. It remained a prototype, but it was the first of the Polish PZL gull wing fighter series, leading to the PZL P.7, PZL P.11 and PZL P.24.

Design and development
Among the first tasks of newly created in 1928 PZL aircraft works was to design a modern fighter for the Polish Air Force. As a result, a construction team led by the talented young designer Zygmunt Puławski designed an all-metal, metal-covered monoplane fighter, designated PZL P.1. Puławski included a high gull wing, to give a pilot an optimal view, without an upper wing before his eyes, like in classic parasol monoplanes and biplanes of that time. The wing, supported with struts, could be thin in its root part, at joint with a fuselage. Other innovations included a scissors-like fixed undercarriage, with shock absorbers hidden in the fuselage. The P.1 was powered with a  Hispano-Suiza inline engine.

The first prototype was flown in August 1929 by Bolesław Orliński. In the first flight, the wing leading edge distorted, but Orliński saved the aircraft and possibly the program. In late 1929, after static trials, the prototype was modified and strengthened. In March 1930, the second prototype was flown (P.1/II). It introduced, among other changes, a revised rudder shape, similar to those used on later fighters.

The second prototype took part in a fighter contest in Bucharest in June 1930, where it placed 4th out of 7 competitors, but it won in 8 of 15 trials.

The P.1 remained a prototype, because it was decided that a fighter for the Polish Air Force would be powered with a radial engine produced in Poland. As a result, the next fighter designs were produced with radial engines, but were still based upon the P.1, starting with the PZL P.6. This decision has since been criticized by some modern authors, as single row radial engines produce more drag, without advantage of more power, and reduced visibility from the cockpit. It was planned in 1929-1930 to build an improved P.1, with the designation  PZL P.2, but this was abandoned after building the fuselage. Puławski himself hoped for a second chance to build fighters powered with inline engines, and developed the PZL P.8 with an inline in 1931.

Technical description

The PZL P.1 was an all-metal braced high-wing monoplane, duralumin-covered. The fuselage was made of a duralumin frame, rectangular in cross-section. Two-spar wing of trapezoid shape, thinner by the fuselage, covered with a rimmed Wibault type duralumin sheet, supported with two struts on either side. Pilot's cockpit was open, with a windshield. Two fuel tanks in wings (400 L). A fixed undercarriage with a rear skid. Inline engine in front, with a water radiator under the fuselage, two-blade propeller.

Operators

Polish Air Force

Specifications (P.1/II)

See also

References

Further reading

 Cynk, Jerzy B. History of the Polish Air Force 1918-1968. Reading, Berkshire, UK: Osprey Publishing Ltd., 1972. .
 Eberspacher, Warren A. and Jan P. Koniarek.  PZL Fighters Part One - P.1 through P.8. (International Squadron Monograph 2). St. Paul, MN: Phalanx Publishing Co., Ltd., 1995. .
 Glass, Andrzej. Polskie konstrukcje lotnicze 1893-1939 (in Polish: "Polish Aviation Constructions 1893-1939"). Warszawa, Poland: WKiŁ, 1977. No ISBN (main source).

External links

Photos and drawings at Ugolok Neba

1920s Polish fighter aircraft
Gull-wing aircraft
P.1
Single-engined tractor aircraft
Aircraft first flown in 1929